Song Je-Heon  (born 17 July 1986) is a South Korean football forward, who plays for Gyeongnam FC in K League Classic.

Club career

Song started his professional football career with the Pohang Steelers in 2009.  On January 6, 2010, he transferred to Daegu FC, and became a regular in the senior squad, starting in a number of matches for the club.

Club career statistics

References

External links

1986 births
Living people
Association football forwards
South Korean footballers
Pohang Steelers players
Daegu FC players
Jeonbuk Hyundai Motors players
Gimcheon Sangmu FC players
Gyeongnam FC players
K League 1 players
K League 2 players